Aaron Jarvis (born 20 May 1986) is a former Wales international rugby union player. A prop forward he had previously played for the Dragons, ASM Clermont Auvergne, Ospreys and Bath. He is the assistant coach for the Dallas Jackals in the Major League Rugby (MLR).

In February 2011, it was announced that Jarvis had signed for the Ospreys for the 2011–12 season.

Jarvis joined the Dragons for the 2018–19 season. He retired at the end of 2021 to take up a coaching position for the Dallas Jackals.

International

Jarvis is eligible to represent Wales as his grandmother was born in Wales. In October 2012 Jarvis was named in the 35 man Wales squad for the Autumn international series. He made his international debut on 10 November 2012 against Argentina in Cardiff.

References

External links
Ospreys profile

1986 births
Living people
Bath Rugby players
Dragons RFC players
English people of Welsh descent
English rugby union players
Ospreys (rugby union) players
Rugby union players from Exeter
Wales international rugby union players
ASM Clermont Auvergne players
Rugby union props